Zev John (born 14 June 1998) is a Papua New Guinean professional rugby league footballer who plays as a  forward for the Central Queensland Capras in the Queensland Cup and  at international level.

Early life
John was born in Mount Hagen, Papua New Guinea and moved to Australia in 2015. He played junior rugby league for Altona Roosters and then graduated into the Victoria under 20’s in 2017. He was part of the Melbourne Storm development squad from 2016-18.

Career
John then made his Queensland Intrust Cup debut for Redcliffe Dolphins. He made his international debut for Papua New Guinea in their 24-6 defeat by Samoa in the 2019 Oceania Cup. John joined the Mackay Cutters for the 2020 season.

References

External links
Redcliffe Dolphins profile
 Tweed Heads Seagulls profile

1998 births
Living people
Central Queensland Capras players
Mackay Cutters players
Papua New Guinean rugby league players
Papua New Guinea national rugby league team players
Redcliffe Dolphins players
Rugby league props